Bruno Pittermann (3 September 1905 – 19 September 1983) was an Austrian social democrat politician. He served as both the chairman of the Social Democratic Party of Austria from 1957 to 1967, and the Vice Chancellor of Austria from 1957 to 1966. From 1964 to 1976, he was president of the Socialist International.

1905 births
1983 deaths
Politicians from Vienna
Vice-Chancellors of Austria
Presidents of the Socialist International
Grand Crosses 1st class of the Order of Merit of the Federal Republic of Germany